The 50th Edition Vuelta a España (Tour of Spain), a long-distance bicycle stage race and one of the three grand tours, was held from 2 September to 24 September 1995. Jalabert won the three classification competitions – the general classification, the points classification and the mountains classification being only the third rider (after Eddy Merckx in the 1968 Giro d'Italia and the 1969 Tour de France, and Tony Rominger in the 1993 Vuelta a España) to win all three major classifications in a Grand Tour.

The 1995 Vuelta was the first edition that was not held in April and May, as had previously been the case, but instead in September as the last of the three Grand Tours of the year. This was done to attract more high-profile riders, who before had preferred to ride the Giro d'Italia or the Tour de France, which both took place very closely to the Vuelta's timeslot.

Background 

The Mapei squad arrived in disarray, after one of their lead riders, Fernando Escartín, announced that he would move to Kelme the following year. He was therefore left out of the team, which was led by Abraham Olano. The starting field also included Laurent Jalabert, Alex Zülle, former winner Melcior Mauri (all ), Marco Pantani and a then unknown Jan Ullrich in his first ever Grand Tour appearance.

Route and stages

Race overview 
The race started with a prologue time trial in Zaragoza, won by Olano, two seconds ahead of Jalabert. The latter would move into the leader's golden jersey after stage 3, based on a stage win at Alto del Naranco. Olano moved closer in the general classification after the stage-7 time trial in Salamanca, but only gained 23 seconds on Jalabert due to a fall and a puncture along the route. On stage 8 to Ávila, Jalabert attacked almost from the beginning. Olano, left isolated, lost 4:40 minutes and all hopes of winning the Vuelta. Over the course of the two time trials, Olano gained 2:42 minutes on Jalabert, enough to make up for his losses on all stages but the one to Ávila. From this point on, Jalabert only attacked the field close to the finish line, collecting few advantages and some bonus seconds. His lead was so comfortable that he was able to abort an attack on the way to Sierra Nevada and gift the stage win to escapee Bert Dietz.

Classification leadership

Final classification

References 

Citations

External links 
 La Vuelta (Official site in Spanish, English, and French)
 cyclingnews

 
1995 in road cycling
1995
1995 in Spanish sport